Cactus fries are a food originating in the Southwestern United States. They are typically prepared from prickly pear cactus segments which have had the needles removed, and which are then sliced, battered, and deep fried.

See also

 Nopales
 Cuisine of the Southwestern United States
 Fried cassava
 French fries
 Fried sweet potato

References

Further reading
 

Cuisine of the Southwestern United States
Deep fried foods